Endoreversible thermodynamics is a subset of irreversible thermodynamics aimed at making more realistic assumptions about heat transfer than are typically made in reversible thermodynamics. It gives an upper bound on the energy that can be derived from a real process that is lower than that predicted by Carnot for a Carnot cycle, and accommodates the exergy destruction occurring as heat is transferred irreversibly.

Endoreversible thermodynamics was discovered in simultaneous work by Novikov and Chambadal, although sometimes mistakenly attributed to Curzon & Ahlborn.

Novikov engine 

An equation for the efficiency of a semi-ideal heat engine operating at maximum power output in which heat transfer is irreversible but other components are ideal can be shown to have the following form, which is the Chambadal–Novikov efficiency:

In the limit of infinitesimally small power output, the standard Carnot result for efficiency is recovered.  For some typical cycles, the above equation (note that absolute temperatures must be used) gives the following results:

As shown, the endoreversible efficiency much more closely models the observed data. However, such an engine violates Carnot's principle which states that work can be done any time there is a difference in temperature. The fact that the hot and cold reservoirs are not at the same temperature as the working fluid they are in contact with means that work can and is done at the hot and cold reservoirs. The result is tantamount to coupling the high and low temperature parts of the cycle, so that the cycle collapses. In the Carnot cycle there is strict necessity that the working fluid be at the same temperatures as the heat reservoirs they are in contact with and that they are separated by adiabatic transformations which prevent thermal contact. The efficiency was first derived by William Thomson in his study of an unevenly heated body in which the adiabatic partitions between bodies at different temperatures are removed and maximum work is performed.

Due to occasional confusion about the origins of the above equation, it is sometimes named the Chambadal–Novikov–Curzon–Ahlborn efficiency.

See also 

An introduction to endoreversible thermodynamics is given in the thesis by Katharina Wagner. It is also introduced by Hoffman et al. A thorough discussion of the concept, together with many applications in engineering, is given in the book by Hans Ulrich Fuchs.

References 

Thermodynamics